Simon Goodwin (born 26 December 1976) is an Australian rules football coach and former player. He has been the senior coach of the Melbourne Football Club of the Australian Football League (AFL) since 2017.

As a player, Goodwin tallied 275 AFL games, all as a midfielder for the Adelaide Football Club between 1996 and 2010. He won two premierships with the Crows in 1997 and 1998, was a five-time All-Australian, and captained Adelaide for his final three seasons. As coach of Melbourne, Goodwin led the Demons back into the finals in 2018, and in 2021 coached Melbourne to its first premiership victory in 57 years. 

Goodwin was inducted into the Australian Football Hall of Fame as a player in 2017.

Playing career

Adelaide Crows

Early career (1996–1999)
Prior to embarking on his AFL career, Goodwin was an accomplished junior cricketer, co-captaining the South Australian Under-19 cricket team. Recruited from South Adelaide in the SANFL with pick No. 18 in the 1996 Pre-season Draft, Goodwin made his debut for Adelaide Crows in Round 1, 1997, however, his game was marred by a severe quadriceps injury which kept him out for months.

Goodwin returned to the side in Round 14 to face West Coast, holding his position until he was omitted following the Round 18 victory over Carlton at Football Park. Goodwin earned a recall prior to the beginning of the 1997 finals series, returning solid performances in all four of Adelaide's wins, including 19 possessions and a goal in the victorious 1997 Grand Final.

After a poor start to 1998, Goodwin blossomed in the second half of the season, showing glimpses of the prolific ball-winner he would become in later years and once again playing a solid role in all four finals on the way to Adelaide's second premiership win in the 1998 Grand Final.

The 1999 season was to be one of disappointment, however, as Goodwin's performances mirrored that of his club. Despite featuring in 19 of Adelaide's 22 games, Goodwin's progress was marred by inconsistency as Adelaide finished a lowly 13th in what was, at the time, the club's worst-ever finish to a season.

Rising career (2000–2004)
Following his disappointing 1999, Goodwin emerged as a star in his own right in the 2000 season with a string of assured midfield displays earning both his first All-Australian guernsey and Gold Jacket as Adelaide Club Champion. Goodwin capped this watershed year with selection to the Adelaide Football Club Team of the Decade.

Another All-Australian selection followed in 2001 with consistently good performances alongside fellow star midfielders Mark Ricciuto, Andrew McLeod and Tyson Edwards pushing Adelaide back into premiership reckoning for 2002 after three seasons where the club had finished no higher than eighth.

In 2002 Goodwin struggled for consistency, in part due to the extra attention he was receiving from opposition taggers. Highly prolific games such as his 39 possession/1 goal game against Collingwood in Round 14 were contrasted by his 17 possession game against Fremantle in Round 7. After suffering an injury in Round 19 against Essendon, Goodwin returned to the team in time for the finals, where despite high expectations the Crows were defeated in a preliminary final.

A member of Adelaide's pre-season premiership-winning team, Goodwin's highly promising 2003 was marred by a broken arm suffered early in the Round 11 clash with Hawthorn at the MCG when he collided with the boundary fence following a contest. Upon his return to the side in Round 17 Goodwin looked to be far from his best, able only to provide a series of steady displays as the Crows, despite being one of the hot premiership favourites, were knocked out in a semi-final.

As with 1999, Goodwin endured another horror year to mirror that of Adelaide's in 2004. Sidelined with an adductor injury between Rounds 4 and 16, by the time Goodwin returned Gary Ayres had resigned and been replaced by Neil Craig as the Crows languished near the lower end of the ladder. To further rub salt into the wound Goodwin was cited for tripping Roger James and suspended for one week in Adelaide's 25-point loss to eventual premiers Port Adelaide in Round 22.

Career high (2005–2007)

Goodwin and Adelaide's fortunes turned around completely in 2005 as the side unexpectedly won the minor premiership despite being tipped by many for the wooden spoon. Individually Goodwin capped a superb return to top form, winning his third All-Australian guernsey and capturing his second club champion award. His stellar form continued in 2006, first winning the Michael Tuck Medal for best afield in Adelaide's pre-season grand final loss to Geelong (the only player to do so in a loss), before again performing brilliantly in the season proper, winning his fourth All-Australian selection and third Gold Jacket.

Captaincy (2008–2010)
In early December 2007, Goodwin was named the captain for Adelaide for the 2008 football season. This coincided with a move into the forward line to allow the club's young midfielders to gain experience and bolster a struggling attack. The move paid dividends with Goodwin enjoying a career-best seven-goal haul in Adelaide's crushing Round 2 victory over the West Coast Eagles. In later matches, Goodwin was rotated between the forward and back half, increasingly the latter in order to allow young forwards to stake their claims for a permanent spot.

In Round 15, 2009, Goodwin played his 250th game. The Adelaide Crows celebrated by defeating Fremantle by 117 points, 19.16 (130) to 1.7 (13), shattering a number of records in doing so.

Retirement
On 25 May 2010, Goodwin announced he would retire at the conclusion of the 2010 AFL season.

International rules
Goodwin served as the Australia international rules football team's goalkeeper for the 2004 International Rules Series.

Coaching career

Essendon Football Club
On 30 September 2010, Goodwin announced his appointment as assistant coach at Essendon Football Club. On 27 August 2013, it was announced that Goodwin would take over as Essendon's caretaker senior coach for the final round of the 2013 season, following the 12-month suspension handed to James Hird as a result of the Essendon supplements saga. In his only game at the helm, Essendon lost to Richmond by 39 points. 

On 10 October 2013, Goodwin was promoted to the role of senior assistant coach for the 2014 season, following Mark Thompson's appointment as interim senior coach for the period of Hird's suspension.

Melbourne Football Club
On 18 September 2014, Goodwin signed a five-year contract with the Melbourne Football Club. He served for two years as an assistant coach under senior coach Paul Roos before taking over as senior coach for three years from 2017 in a succession plan. After a ninth-place finish in 2017, Goodwin led the club to its first finals series in twelve years in 2018. Melbourne reached the preliminary final, where they lost to eventual premiers West Coast by sixty-six points at Optus Stadium.

After falling to second-last in 2019 and narrowly missing out on the finals in the shortened 2020 season, Melbourne under Goodwin surged forward in 2021, winning their first nine games, their best unbeaten start to a season since 1956, and  never finished a round lower than fourth on the ladder. Melbourne won their first minor premiership since 1964 — then their most recent premiership season — and advanced to their first Grand Final since 2000, prior to which Goodwin was named AFLCA Coach of the Year. In the 2021 AFL Grand Final against the Western Bulldogs, Goodwin's Demons started well, but faltered in the second and early in the third quarter and trailed by as much as nineteen points. Melbourne then put together a massive turnaround, scoring the next twelve goals en route to a 74-point victory, claiming their thirteenth flag and ending their 57-year premiership drought.

Statistics

Playing statistics

|-
| scope=row bgcolor=F0E68C | 1997# ||  || 36
| 10 || 4 || 1 || 93 || 26 || 119 || 32 || 25 || 0.4 || 0.1 || 9.3 || 2.6 || 11.9 || 3.2 || 2.5 || 0
|-
| scope=row bgcolor=F0E68C | 1998# ||  || 36
| 21 || 8 || 6 || 202 || 89 || 291 || 60 || 45 || 0.4 || 0.3 || 9.6 || 4.2 || 13.9 || 2.9 || 2.1 || 0
|-
| 1999 ||  || 36
| 19 || 2 || 2 || 148 || 77 || 225 || 49 || 17 || 0.1 || 0.1 || 7.8 || 4.1 || 11.8 || 2.6 || 0.9 || 0
|-
| 2000 ||  || 36
| 22 || 15 || 21 || 284 || 177 || 461 || 104 || 28 || 0.7 || 1.0 || 12.9 || 8.0 || 21.0 || 4.7 || 1.3 || 7
|-
| 2001 ||  || 36
| 23 || 16 || 11 || 370 || 149 || 519 || 73 || 90 || 0.7 || 0.5 || 16.1 || 6.5 || 22.6 || 3.2 || 3.9 || 10
|-
| 2002 ||  || 36
| 22 || 17 || 16 || 271 || 205 || 476 || 61 || 63 || 0.8 || 0.7 || 12.3 || 9.3 || 21.6 || 2.8 || 2.9 || 7
|-
| 2003 ||  || 36
| 19 || 13 || 12 || 208 || 137 || 345 || 62 || 43 || 0.7 || 0.6 || 10.9 || 7.2 || 18.2 || 3.3 || 2.3 || 0
|-
| 2004 ||  || 36
| 10 || 6 || 2 || 123 || 65 || 188 || 38 || 22 || 0.6 || 0.2 || 12.3 || 6.5 || 18.8 || 3.8 || 2.2 || 2
|-
| 2005 ||  || 36
| 24 || 20 || 12 || 313 || 233 || 546 || 107 || 64 || 0.8 || 0.5 || 13.0 || 9.7 || 22.8 || 4.5 || 2.7 || 9
|-
| 2006 ||  || 36
| 24 || 12 || 12 || 369 || 270 || 639 || 101 || 83 || 0.5 || 0.5 || 15.4 || 11.3 || 26.6 || 4.2 || 3.5 || 10
|-
| 2007 ||  || 36
| 21 || 10 || 8 || 268 || 248 || 516 || 91 || 53 || 0.5 || 0.4 || 12.8 || 11.8 || 24.6 || 4.3 || 2.5 || 12
|-
| 2008 ||  || 36
| 23 || 33 || 29 || 272 || 196 || 468 || 120 || 61 || 1.4 || 1.3 || 11.8 || 8.5 || 20.3 || 5.2 || 2.7 || 5
|-
| 2009 ||  || 36
| 21 || 4 || 2 || 220 || 328 || 548 || 119 || 46 || 0.2 || 0.1 || 10.5 || 15.6 || 26.1 || 5.7 || 2.2 || 6
|-
| 2010 ||  || 36
| 16 || 2 || 1 || 185 || 217 || 402 || 81 || 58 || 0.1 || 0.1 || 11.6 || 13.6 || 25.1 || 5.1 || 3.6 || 6
|- class=sortbottom
! colspan=3 | Career
! 275 !! 162 !! 135 !! 3326 !! 2417 !! 5743 !! 1098 !! 698 !! 0.6 !! 0.5 !! 12.1 !! 8.8 !! 20.9 !! 4.0 !! 2.5 !! 74
|}

Coaching statistics
Updated to the end of the 2022 season.

|- style="background-color: #EAEAEA"
| 2013 || 
| 1 || 0 || 1 || 0 || 0.0% || 9 || 18
|-
| 2017 || 
| 22 || 12 || 10 || 0 || 54.5% || 9 || 18
|- style="background-color: #EAEAEA"
| 2018 || 
| 25 || 16 || 9 || 0 || 64.0% || 4 || 18
|-
| 2019 || 
| 22 || 5 || 17 || 0 || 22.7% || 17 || 18
|- style="background-color: #EAEAEA"
| 2020 || 
| 17 || 9 || 8 || 0 || 52.9% || 9 || 18
|- 
| scope=row bgcolor=F0E68C | 2021# || 
| 25 || 20 || 4 || 1 || 80.0% || 1 || 18
|- style="background-color: #EAEAEA"
| 2022 || 
| 23 || 15 || 8 || 0 || 65.2% || 2 || 18
|- 
! colspan=2| Career totals
! 135
! 77
! 57
! 1
! 57.41%
! colspan=2|
|}

Notes

Honours and achievements

Playing honours
Team
 2× AFL premiership player: 1997, 1998
 McClelland Trophy: 2005
 AFL Pre-Season Cup: 2003

Individual
 AFLCA Champion Player of the Year Award: 2006
 5× All-Australian team: 2000, 2001, 2005, 2006, 2009
 Adelaide Captain: 2008–2010
 3× Malcolm Blight Medal: 2000, 2005, 2006
 Dream Team representative honours in AFL Hall of Fame Tribute Match
 2× Australian international rules football team: 2000, 2001
 State of Origin (South Australia): 1998
 Michael Tuck Medal: 2006
 Showdown Medal: 2005 (Round 20), 2007 (Round 18)
Australian Football Hall of Fame inductee: 2017
Adelaide Team of the Decade 1991-2000

Coaching honours
Team
 AFL Premiership coach: 2021
 McClelland Trophy: 2021

Individual
 Jock McHale Medal: 2021
 All-Australian team: 2021
 AFLCA Allan Jeans Senior Coach of the Year Award: 2021

Controversy
On 1 March 2007, Goodwin was fined a record $40,000 and ordered to undertake compulsory counselling for placing four bets involving AFL matches totalling $16,024.58. Goodwin, along with three other players, became the first players in AFL history to be caught for betting on AFL matches.

References

External links 

 

Adelaide Football Club players
Adelaide Football Club Premiership players
1976 births
Living people
All-Australians (AFL)
Malcolm Blight Medal winners
South Adelaide Football Club players
Australian rules footballers from Adelaide
Essendon Football Club coaches
South Australian Football Hall of Fame inductees
Australian Football Hall of Fame inductees
Australia international rules football team players
Melbourne Football Club coaches
Melbourne Football Club Premiership coaches
Two-time VFL/AFL Premiership players
One-time VFL/AFL Premiership coaches